Dermestidae are a family of Coleoptera that are commonly referred to as skin beetles. Other common names include larder beetle, hide or leather beetles, carpet beetles, and khapra beetles. There are over 1,800 species described.

Dermestids have a variety of habits; most genera are scavengers that feed on dry animal or plant material, such as skin or pollen, animal hair, feathers, dead insects and natural fibers. Members of Dermestes are found in animal carcasses, while others may be found in mammal, bird, bee, or wasp nests. Thaumaglossa only lives in the egg cases of mantids, while Trogoderma species are pests of grain.

These beetles are significant in forensic entomology. Some species are associated with decaying carcasses, which helps with criminal investigations. Some species are pests (urban entomology) and can cause extensive damage to natural fibers in homes and businesses.

They are used in taxidermy and by natural history museums to clean animal skeletons. Some dermestid species, commonly called "bow bugs", infest violin cases, feeding on the bow hair.

Description 
Adult Dermestidae are generally small beetles (1-12 mm long), rounded to oval in shape, with hairy or scaly elytra that may form distinctive and colourful patterns. Except in genera Dermestes and Trichelodes, there is a single ocellus in the middle of the head. The antennae are clubbed (except in male Thylodrias contractus) and usually fit into a groove on the underside of the thorax, concealing them when the beetle is at rest. Adult females of T. contractus are notable for being larviform, meaning they retain a larval morphology even into adulthood.

Larval Dermestidae range from 5 to 15 mm long and are usually covered in tufts of long, dense hairs (setae). In subfamily Megatominae and the genus Trinodes, some of these setae are hastisetae: barbed setae ending in spear-like heads (hasta being the Latin word for "spear"). Hastisetae serve a defensive role, detaching and entangling predators.

Pupae of subfamilies Dermestinae and Attageninae are covered in structures known as gin-traps, as defense against predators. Pupae of Megatominae are protected within the exuviae of the last larval instar.

Diet and behaviour

Dermestid larvae are typically found on dry organic items that are hard for other organisms to digest, such as dried foodstuffs, skins, hides, wood and other natural fibers. In forensic studies, the larvae are found on human corpses during the dry and skeletal phases of decomposition, which occurs several days after death. Larvae also move away from light and often hide in any cavity in order to remain undisturbed. In natural habitats, they can be found on animal carcasses, under bark, and in the webs, nests and burrows of various animals.

Larvae of subfamilies Dermestinae and Attageninae (which lack hastisetae), burrow into feeding substrates, pupate in concealed locations, and show fast escape behaviours when disturbed. Larvae of Megatominae (which have hastisetae), do not burrow, pupate where they have been feeding, and their response to disturbance is to stop moving, arch the body and spread the hastisetae. This difference may be because hastisetae would be a hindrance for burrowing larvae.

Adult dermestids are known to feed on pollen and nectar. Adults of Dermestes are cannibalistic and will eat young larvae and pupae; this means that when kept in captivity, adults should be placed in separate containers from the immature stages.

Economic relevance

Urban and stored products

Dermestid beetles are destructive to a number of common items. Natural fibers such as wool, silk, cotton, linen, fur, or feathers are much more prone to attack than synthetic fibers. Dermestids also attack chocolate, copra, and cocoa beans.

Medical 
Dermestid hastisetae, both those attached to exuviae and those shed by larvae, cause health problems in humans when inhaled (rhinoconjunctivitis, asthma), ingested in contaminated food (nausea, fever, diarrhea, proctitis, perianal itching) or touched with skin (dermatitis).

Forensic

Dermestes maculatus, hide beetles, also have the potential to offer investigators an estimation of the time since death in homicide or questionable cases. Similar to the use of flies in forensic entomology, the arrival of D. maculatus to carrion occurs in a predictable succession. Adult D. maculatus beetles generally arrive 5 to 11 days after death. In an attempt to refine this relatively wide range, recent research has repeated arthropod succession studies. These studies are applied to estimate the arrival of various species of Dermestidae after death. Development for dermestids is temperature dependent, and the optimal temperature for D. maculatus is 30˚C. Development data is normalized using Accumulated Degree Days. Dermestids can also be used in cases involving entomotoxicology, where feces and shed larval skins can be analyzed for toxins.

Dermestes maculatus collected from raccoon carcass:

Genera 
Dermestidae contains the following 74 genera:

Adelaidella Zhou, Ślipiński & Liu, 2020
Adelaidia Blackburn, 1891
Afrothorictus Andreae, 1967
Amberoderma Háva & Prokop, 2004
Anthrenocerus Arrow, 1915
Anthrenus Geoffroy, 1762
Apphianus Beal, 2005
Apsectus LeConte, 1854
Araphonotos Beal & Kadej, 2008
Attagenus Latreille, 1802
Caccoleptoides Herrmann, Háva & Kadej, 2015
Caccoleptus Sharp, 1902
Chilattagenus Háva, 2021
Claviella Kalík, 1987
†Cretoattagenus Háva, 2020
†Cretodermestes Deng, Ślipiński, Ren & Pang, 2017
†Cretomegatoma Háva, 2021
†Cretonodes Kirejtshuk & Azar, 2009
Cryptorhopalum Guérin-Méneville, 1838
Ctesias Stephens, 1830
Dearthrus LeConte, 1861
Derbyana Lawrence & Ślipiński, 2005
Dermalius Háva, 2001
Dermeanthrenus Háva, 2008
Dermestes Linnaeus, 1758
†Eckfeldattagenus Háva & Wappler, 2014
Egidyella Reitter, 1899
Evorinea Beal, 1961
Globicornis Latreille, 1829
Hemirhopalum Sharp, 1902
Hexanodes Blair, 1941
Hirtomegatoma Pic, 1931
Jiriella Kitano, 2013
Katkaenus Háva, 2006
Labrocerus Sharp, 1885
Liberorphinus Háva & Matsumoto, 2021
Macrothorictus Andreae, 1967
Mariouta Pic, 1898
Megatoma Herbst, 1791
Miocryptorhopalum Pierce, 1960
Myrmeanthrenus Armstrong, 1945
Novelsis Casey, 1900
†Oisenodes Kirejtshuk, Háva & Nel, 2010
Orbeola Mulsant & Rey, 1868
Orphilus Erichson, 1846
Orphinus Motschulsky, 1858
Papuderma Háva, 2021
†Paradermestes Deng, Ślipiński, Ren & Pang, 2017
Paranovelsis Casey, 1900
Paratrogoderma Scott, 1926
Pecticaccoleptus Háva, 2004
Phradonoma Jacquelin du Val, 1859
Ranolus Blair, 1929
Reesa Beal, 1967
Rhopalosilpha Arrow, 1929
Sefrania Pic, 1899
Socotracornis Háva, 2013
Sodaliatoma Háva, 2013
Thaumaglossa Redtenbacher, 1867
Thorictodes Reitter, 1875
Thorictus Germar, 1834
Thylodrias Motschulsky, 1839
Trichelodes Carter, 1935
Trichodryas Lawrence & Ślipiński, 2005
Trinodes Dejean, 1821
Trinoparvus Háva, 2004
Trogoderma Dejean, 1821
Trogoparvus Háva, 2001
†Tuberphradonoma Háva, 2021
Turcicornis Háva, 2000
Valdesetosum Háva, 2015
Volvicornis Háva & Kalík, 2004
Zahradnikia Háva, 2013
Zhantievus Beal, 1992

Selected Taxa

Larder beetles

The larva of the larder beetle Dermestes lardarius is longer than the adult and is covered in reddish brown or black setae. It has two back-curved, spine-like appendages on the posterior end. The larva of the black larder beetle has less strongly curved appendages. Mature larvae of both species tend to bore into hard substrates such as wood, cork, and plaster to pupate.

Larder beetles are infrequent household pests. Adults and larvae feed on raw skins and hides. Adult larder beetles are generally 1/3 to 3/8 of an inch long and are dark brown with a broad, pale yellow spotted band across the upper portion of the elytra. There are three black dots arranged in a triangle shape on each wing. The sternum and legs of the larder beetle are covered in fine, yellow setae. Adult larder beetles are typically found outdoors in protected areas during the winter, but during the spring and early summer they enter buildings. Females lay approximately 135 eggs near a food source, and the eggs will hatch in about 12 days. The life cycle of larder beetles lasts around 40 to 50 days.

The black larder or incinerator beetle, Dermestes ater, is completely dark with scattered yellow setae on the body. It is similar to Dermestes maculatus but lacks serrations on its elytra. Its ventral surface is yellow instead of white. This beetle is a pest of fish, mushrooms, and cheese.

Hide beetle (leather beetle)
Dermestes maculatus, known as the hide beetle, leather beetle, or skin beetle, feeds on raw skins and hides like the larder beetle. This species is similar in appearance to the larder beetle, with larvae covered in short and long reddish brown or black setae, but its two spine-like posterior appendages curve forward. Also, in adults, the forewings are dark brown and the sternum is mostly white with some black. Its life cycle is 60 to 70 days and the female can lay up to 800 eggs.

The hide and larder beetles both feed on an assortment of animal protein based products and cause serious damage in the areas of silkworm production and museums.

Carpet beetle

Carpet beetle larvae start to feed as soon as they hatch. They are carrot shaped and heavily covered with setae, especially on their posterior end. The number of instars typically ranges from five to 11 and in some cases may reach as high as 20. Larvae of the black carpet beetle Attagenus megatoma may grow up to 1/2 inch (12 mm) and be yellow to brown in color. Other types of carpet beetle are regularly 1/4 to 1 inch (6 to 25 mm) long and covered with dark setae. Certain species have distinctive tufts of setae extending from their posterior end. These beetles are attracted to soiled fabrics and crevices where dead insects may serve as a food source. The larvae of the carpet beetle are often referred to as "woolly bears" or "buffalo moths".

Black carpet beetle

The black carpet beetle, Attagenus megatoma, is a widely known stored product pest and one of the most destructive because of its potential damage to household products containing keratin, which is a protein found in animal hair and feathers. They are also able to burrow through various types of food packaging, allowing passage for other insects.

Females can lay up to 90 eggs and they hatch in about 8 to 15 days. Generally, this species only has one generation a year. The time it takes to become an adult varies from six months to a year. In addition, an adult black carpet beetle can live for an additional two months. The average adult size is about 2.8 to 5 mm long and they are oval, dark brown to shiny-black in color, and have brown legs.

Varied carpet beetle

The varied carpet beetle, Anthrenus verbasci, attacks typical household objects. Carpet beetles are normally associated with things such as carpets, wool, furs, and any processed animal or plant food. Their appetite also includes dead insects, spiders, and even nectar and pollen. They are typically found throughout the United States and Canada. Females can lay up to 40 eggs and the number of larval instars is seven or eight. The time it takes to become an adult varies from about eight months to a year. In addition, the adults can live around 2 to 6 weeks. This species varies in shape, size, color, and pattern of scales. On average, the adults are 2 to 3 mm in length and have scales that vary from white, brown, yellow, or even gray-yellow. The hairs of the larvae can cause allergic reactions such as contact dermatitis or blisters in humans who come into contact with the sharp tiny hairs.

Khapra beetle

On hatching, the larvae of khapra beetle (Trogoderma granarium) are around 1.6 to 1.8 mm long and mostly covered with dense setae, some simple and some barbed. Larvae are yellow-white but the head and body setae are brown. As the larvae further develop, their color changes to a golden or reddish brown and the abdomen portion becomes proportionally shorter. The mature larvae reach a maximum length of 6 mm long and 1.5 mm wide.

The khapra beetle is a stored-product pest. Infestations are difficult to control because they crawl into cracks and crevices, remaining for long periods of time. They tend to infest grains and create serious losses to stored products. The adults are covered with setae and are approximately 1.5 to 3 mm long and 1 to 2 mm wide. Male khapra beetles are brown to black with reddish brown markings on the elytra. Females are slightly larger and are lighter in color. The short, 11 segmented antennae has a club of 3 to 5 segments, which fit into a groove on the side of the pronotum.

Control

Hide and larder beetles

Modern methods of meat slaughtering, storage, and distribution have reduced potential infestations of hide beetles. Proper housekeeping is crucial for the prevention of infestations. Dead insects in homes usually attract these beetles because they are a prime food source for hide and larder beetles. Food must be tightly sealed or stored in a refrigerator to avoid any beetle access. Freezing food for a week or heating meat in a pan or microwave for prolonged lengths can kill insects found in infested foods and prevent them from spreading.

Household fibers, such as wool and silk, are especially prone to moth damage and special cleaning, which includes moth proofing, needs to be done frequently. Application of insecticides must be by spot treatment to crack and crevice sites where they are suspected of hiding. Pyrethrins are labeled for use against hide beetles. Insecticides used for carpet beetles are also appropriate to use against hide and larder beetles.

Carpet beetles

Regular cleaning of spilled food or lint will eliminate any sites for potential breeding. Susceptible items like food, woolens, and furs should be stored in an insect-proof container. If an infestation is suspected then the source of the problem must be removed and destroyed to further limit any possibility of spreading. These beetles can be killed with extreme heat or exposure to freezers.

Pyrethroid insecticides can be used to control carpet beetles. These contain active ingredients such as permethrin, bifenthrin, deltamethrin and tralomethrin.

Diatomaceous earth is also effective.

Image gallery

References

Further reading
 John M. Kingsolver, "Dermestidae", in Ross H. Arnett Jr. and Michael C. Thomas, American Beetles (CRC Press, 2002), vol. 2.
 
Pasquerault, T Vincent, B, Chauvet, B, Dourel, L, and Gaudry, E (2008). Répartition des espèces du genre Dermestes L. 1758 récoltés sur des cadavres humains (Coleoptera Dermestidae). L'entomologiste Tome 64 N°4 pp 221–224.
 Hinton, H.E., 1945 A monograph of the beetles associated with stored products. 1, 387–395 British Museum (Natural History), London. Keys to world adults and larvae, genera and species; excellent figures, full species information.
 Freude, H.; Harde, K.W.; Lohse, G.A., 1979 Dermestidae. Die Käfer Mitteleuropas 6: Diversicornia (Lycidae — Byrrhidae) 1206 text figs. 367pp. Goecke & Evers. Text in German; the Dermestidae are on pages 304–327.

External links

 List of North American Species
 Dermestidae-Literature
 Russian Atlas of Carpet Beetles-excellent images
 USDA Leaflet on Carpet beetles
on the UF / IFAS Featured Creatures Web site
 Anthrenus flavipes, furniture carpet beetle
 Anthrenus scrophulariae, common carpet beetle
 Dermestes atar, black larder beetle
 Dermestes maculatus, hide beetle
Stored Product Protection, Kansas State University

 
Beetle families